Guilford Dudley Bailey (June 4 or September 24, 1834 – ) was an Union Army officer during the American Civil War.

Biography
Guilford Dudley Bailey was born in 1834 in Martinsburg, New York.

He graduated from the United States Military Academy at West Point in 1856, and was assigned to the 2nd U.S. Artillery Regiment. He served on frontier and garrison duty, was at Fort Leavenworth during the Kansas disturbances of 1857-59, and at West Point as instructor for a short time in 1859. When the Civil War began he was stationed at Fort Brown, Texas. There his immediate superior, Capt. George Stoneman, refused to surrender when Gen. David E. Twiggs attempted to give up his entire command to the Confederates, thus effecting Bailey's escape via Mexico. Reporting for duty as soon as he could reach Union territory, he was sent with Henry J. Hunt's battery to the relief of Fort Pickens in Florida. Returning on account of sickness, he organized and was appointed Colonel of the 1st New York Light Artillery Regiment on 25 September, 1861. He joined the Army of the Potomac and became Chief of Artillery for Silas Casey's division in the IV Corps during the Peninsula campaign. Bailey was killed among his guns at the Battle of Seven Pines on May 31, 1862. A monument has been raised to his memory in the cemetery at Poughkeepsie.

References

External links

 

Created via preloaddraft
1834 births
1862 deaths
Union Army colonels
People from Martinsburg, New York
United States Military Academy alumni
Union military personnel killed in the American Civil War